Contiguity or contiguous may refer to:

Contiguous data storage, in computer science
Contiguity (probability theory)
Contiguity (psychology)
Contiguous distribution of species, in biogeography
Geographic contiguity of territorial land
Contiguous zone in territorial waters

See also